Khungai is a village panchayat located in the Jhajjar district of the Indian state of Haryana.It is a clean,green and plastic waste free village of haryana.

Geography
Chandigarh is around 238.6 km away.

Delhi- 45.2 km
Jaipur- 209.5 km
Dehradun- 215.9 km
Dulhera, Jhajjar-4 km
Kablana- 2 km
 Ukhalchana Kot - 5 km.

Education
Shaheed Hariom Govt. High School is situated in Khungai.Many other education institutes are near Khungai, including Govt. Polytechnic, Nehru College, Prarambh, Model School, Ganga Institute and Jagan Nath University, NCR.

References

Villages in Jhajjar district